Hlaváček (feminine: Hlaváčková) is a Czech surname. Notable people with the surname include:

 Andrea Hlaváčková (born 1986), Czech tennis player
 Běla Hlaváčková (born 1976), Czech Paralympic swimmer
 Evan Hlavacek (born 1974), American football player
 Ilona Hlaváčková (born 1977), Czech swimmer
 Jana Hlaváčková (born 1981), Czech tennis player
 Jitka Hlaváčková, Czech figure skater
 Joseph F. Hlavacek (1921–1982), American painter
 Karel Hlaváček (1874–1898), Czech poet
 Ladislav Hlaváček (1925–2014), Czech footballer
 Leoš Hlaváček (born 1963), Czech sport shooter
 Martin Hlaváček (born 1980), Czech politician
 Michaela Hlaváčková (born 1989), Slovak model
 Petr Hlaváček (1950–2014), Czech footwear researcher

See also
 
 

Czech-language surnames